Joseph Eldridge (born June 16, 1982) is a former American cyclist who spent his entire career riding for .

He now works as a consultant for the Dutch government.

References

1982 births
Living people
American male cyclists